Priya Ragupathylingam known by her stage name Priya Ragu is a Tamil-Swiss singer-songwriter. She rose to prominence in 2020 for her debut single, "Good Love 2.0".

Biography 

Priya was born to Sri Lankan-Tamil parents in Switzerland. Her parents fled Sri Lanka in 1980s during the civil war. She was raised in Bazenheid, St. Gallen, Switzerland.

Her parents hosted jam sessions with others from the local Tamil community in Switzerland with the intention of making Priya aware of her Tamil heritage as a young child. Her father formed a small band performing songs which featured in Kollywood films. In her father's band, she performed as a singer, her father played tabla and her brother (Japhna Gold) played keyboard. Her father also encouraged her and her brother to sing Tamil songs at cultural events and weddings in order to raise funds to help those who lived in Jaffna and Tamil Nadu.

Career 

After completing her secondary education, she became an accountant for Swiss International Air Lines and moved to Zurich. Although she became a technical buyer for the airline, she continued recording songs in her spare time. Despite her childhood experiences as a singer, her parents did not want her to become a full-fledged professional musician due to their strict and conservative attitudes. Her parents were strictly against western music, MTV videos and pop songs which they considered to be obscene. She however practiced pop songs secretly at her room against her parents' wishes.

She moved to New York in 2017 for a period of 6 months in order to pursue her dream career in music. However, she did not meet any music artists during her brief stay in the United States and instead only found herself collaborating with her music producer-brother, Japhna Gold. During her temporary stay in the US, she collaborated with her brother via Skype as the latter was staying in Switzerland. Priya's brother encouraged her to record songs in Tamil and the duo named their album titled Ragu Wayy.

Her debut mixtape titled damnshestamil consists of 10 tracks include the singles "Good Love 2.0", "Chicken Lemon Rice", "Kamali", "Forgot About", and "Lockdown". "Good Love 2.0" was the first track off of damnshestamil to be released as it was unveiled on 2 October 2020. It was also played on popular BBC radio show Future Sounds and she consequently signed a record deal with Warner Music in October 2020. damnshestamil was produced in collaboration with her brother, Japhna Gold, included backing vocals from her father, and its closing track, "Santhosam", was written by her mother.

She has appeared in British Vogue, on BBC Radio 1 and on the FIFA 21 soundtrack. Vogue India named her as one of the 6 musicians who are about to blow up in 2021.

Discography

Mixtapes

Singles

Music videos

Awards and nominations

References 

Living people
People of Sri Lankan Tamil descent
21st-century Swiss women singers
Swiss singer-songwriters
Swiss accountants
Swiss people of Sri Lankan descent
Year of birth missing (living people)